Jaime Magana Cerda (born October 26, 1978) is a retired left-handed Major League Baseball relief pitcher. Cerda played previously with the New York Mets (–) and the Kansas City Royals (–).

Cerda graduated from Selma High School in California in 1996. He was drafted by the New York Mets in the 23rd round of the  major league baseball draft out of Fresno City Community College.

Cerda is married.

References

External links
Baseball Reference Jaime Cerda page
Baseball Almanac Jaime Cerda page

1978 births
Living people
New York Mets players
Kansas City Royals players
Fresno City Rams baseball players
Major League Baseball pitchers
Baseball players from California
American baseball players of Mexican descent
Tacoma Rainiers players
Binghamton Mets players
Pittsfield Mets players
St. Lucie Mets players
Norfolk Tides players
Omaha Royals players
Colorado Springs Sky Sox players